Something You Got is an album by American flugelhornist Art Farmer featuring performances with Yusef Lateef and the David Matthews Big Band recorded in 1977 and released on the CTI label.

Reception
The Allmusic review stated "The meeting of trumpeter Art Farmer and reed king Yusef Lateef with pianist/arranger David Matthews fronting a big band is a momentous one. The relaxed pace of the set, with its reliance on easy jazz-funk (the title track) and extended funky workouts with stunning hard bop charts by Matthews on "Flute Song," makes for one of the most provocative looks at groove jazz in the CTI label's history".

Track listing
All compositions by David Matthews except as indicated
 "Something You Got" (Chris Kenner) - 6:17 
 "Flute Song" - 8:12 
 "Saudhade" (Fritz Pauer) - 5:55 
 "Sandu" (Clifford Brown) - 7:24 
 "Spain" (Chick Corea) - 5:50 
 "Hombre del Sol" - 7:05 
Recorded at Electric Lady Studios in New York City in July 1977

Personnel
Art Farmer - flugelhorn
Yusef Lateef - tenor saxophone
David Matthews - electric piano, arranger
Burt Collins, Joe Shepley - trumpet, flugelhorn
Sam Burtis - trombone
Tony Price - tuba
Fred Griffin - French horn
Frank Vicari - tenor saxophone
David Tofani - soprano saxophone, flute
Kenny Berger - baritone saxophone, bass clarinet
Hiram Bullock - electric guitar
Harvie Swartz - bass
Jim Madison - drums 
Sue Evans - percussion

References 

CTI Records albums
Art Farmer albums
1977 albums
Albums produced by Creed Taylor
Albums arranged by David Matthews (keyboardist)
Albums recorded at Electric Lady Studios